Stephen Reid (1873–1948) was a Scottish illustrator and painter who specialised in Georgian settings and costume pieces.

Born in Aberdeen, he was educated Gray's School of Art and the Royal Scottish Academy. He was elected to the Royal Society of British Artists at the age of 33. His early work was influenced by Edwin Austin Abbey.

Books he illustrated include :

 
 

 

He also contributed to magazines, including The Strand Magazine and The Connoisseur.

References

External links

 
 

Scottish illustrators
1873 births
1948 deaths